Henry Vanegas Pacheco (born July 29, 1960 in Colombia) is a former Colombian football player and currently manager of second division side EF San Pablo Tacachico

References

External links
http://www.elsalvador.com/deportes/2002/7/15/depor4.shtml
https://web.archive.org/web/20110605072620/http://www.diariocolatino.com/es/20071017/deportes/48209/

1960 births
Living people
Colombian footballers
Colombian football managers
Municipal Limeño managers
Cúcuta Deportivo managers
Puntarenas F.C. managers
Expatriate football managers in El Salvador
Association football midfielders